Presidential and vice- presidential elections were held in South Korea on 20 July 1948, following the Constitutional Assembly elections in May. The president was to be elected by the members of the National Assembly, as instructed by the 1948 Constitution. Of the 198 members of the National Assembly, 196 were present for the vote. A candidate required two-thirds of the votes cast to win. Syngman Rhee was elected with 180 votes, and took over the government to oversee the transfer of power from the United States Army Military Government in Korea.

An important role was played in the run-up to the election by the dispute between Rhee and Kim Gu over the issue of establishing a separate government in the southern part of Korea, instead of including the communist-controlled north. Kim rejected the idea of separate elections, and had boycotted the Constitutional Assembly elections in May, instead campaigning for a united Korea. He also split from the National Alliance for the Rapid Realization of Korean Independence to form the Korea Independence Party. Despite Kim's refusal to take any part in a South-only government and therefore in this election, 13 members cast their votes for Kim.

In the event, Kim's split allowed Rhee to consolidate power over NARRKI and, in 1951, form the Liberal Party, enabling his rule over South Korea until the April Revolution in 1960.

Results

President
In order to be elected, a candidate had to receive at least two-thirds of the votes cast, including blank and invalid ballots. While there were 198 members in the National Assembly, 196 members participated in the voting. Therefore, the number of votes needed to win the presidency was 131.

Even though Kim Gu did not send his approvals for the new South Korean government and insisted that the lawmakers not cast votes for him, 13 of the 196 lawmakers who voted voted for Kim Gu. The election, however, ended as a landslide victory of the only candidate that actively sought the presidency, Rhee Syng-man, who received 180 of the 196 votes cast. One vote was invalidated, as it was cast for independence activist Seo Jae-pil, who at the time was a US citizen.

Vice President
Endorsed by Rhee Syngman and the Korea Democratic Party, former Finance Minister of Provisional Government Yi Si-yeong was elected vice president, but only in the second round. The Constitution stated that for the first two rounds of voting, candidates need to win 2/3 of the votes to win. Had Yi failed to win the required 132 votes in the second round of voting, a runoff election would have been conducted of him and runner-up Kim Gu, and whoever won the plurality of the votes would have become the vice president.

References

South Korea
President
Presidential elections in South Korea